Chatfield v Jones [1990] 3 NZLR 285 is a cited case in New Zealand regarding the issue of notice of cancellation of a contract, where a contract has been breached.

Background
In November 1986, the parties agreed to transfer the shares in Acorn (Fiji) Limited, which operated a tourist train, in the Coral Coast, Fiji for $875,000. When the purchasers neglected to pay for the shares the following year, the shares were resold for $100,000, and sued the purchasers for the loss.

The purchasers defended the claim, saying they were not notified of the cancellation of the contract.

Held
Held, the court ruled that the vendors statement of claim notified them that the contract had been cancelled.

References

Court of Appeal of New Zealand cases
New Zealand contract case law
1990 in New Zealand law
1990 in case law